Bordón is a municipality located in the province of Teruel, Aragon, Spain.
According to the 2010 census the municipality has a population of 141 inhabitants.

See also
Maestrazgo, Aragon
List of municipalities in Teruel

References

External links

Bordón
Sierra de Gúdar - Maestrazgo, Geografía física y humana
El Guerrero Romano

Municipalities in the Province of Teruel